Waischenfeld is a town in the district of Bayreuth, in Bavaria, Germany. It is situated in Franconian Switzerland, 20 km southwest of Bayreuth.

It consists of the following districts: Aalkorb, Breitenlesau, Doos, Eichenbirkig, Gösseldorf, Gutenbiegen, Hammermühle, Hannberg, Heroldsberg, Heroldsberg-Tal, Hubenberg, Köttweinsdorf, Kugelau, Langenloh, Löhlitz, Nankendorf, Neusig, Pulvermühle, Rabeneck, Sauerhof, Saugendorf, Schafhof, Schlößlein, Schönhaid, Schönhof, Seelig, Siegritzberg, Waischenfeld, Zeubach.

The town is the location of Waischenfeld Castle.

Notable People

 Ernst von Bomhard (1833-1912), lawyer, senate president at the Reichsgericht in Leipzig
 Michel Hofmann (1903-1968), State Archives Director in Würzburg, collaborator at the Carl Orff work Carmina Burana

References

Bayreuth (district)